Agelena gaerdesi is a species of spider in the family Agelenidae, which contains at least 1,315 species of funnel-web spiders . It was first described by Roewer, in 1955. It is primarily found in Namibia.

References

Endemic fauna of Namibia
gaerdesi
Arthropods of Namibia
Spiders of Africa
Spiders described in 1955